Baltimore Yearly Meeting (officially the Baltimore Yearly Meeting of the Religious Society of Friends) is a body of the Religious Society of Friends (Quakers) headquartered in Sandy Spring, Maryland that includes Friends from Virginia, Maryland, Pennsylvania, the District of Columbia, and West Virginia. It is one of the oldest yearly meetings in North America, first meeting in May 1672. It is also the only Yearly Meeting in North America visited by George Fox, who visited after a trip to Barbados. Its Presiding Clerk is Stephanie Bean. Baltimore Yearly Meeting (BYM) is part of both Friends General Conference and Friends United Meeting –- two broader bodies of Friends. They are also part of Friends World Committee for Consultation and the Friends Peace Teams Project.

Baltimore Yearly Meeting is composed of fifty local Monthly Meetings. Its constituent Monthly Meetings are in the unprogrammed tradition, which means that they meet for silent worship in which any participant may share whatever they believe the Spirit of God leads them to say.

Baltimore Yearly Meeting has been operating summer camps in the region since the 1920s. Camps currently operated by BYM include Catoctin Quaker Camp, Shiloh Quaker Camp, near Charlottesville, Virginia; Opequon Quaker Camp, near Winchester, Virginia; and the Teen Adventure Program, near Lexington, Virginia.

Baltimore Yearly Meeting was home to  Tom Fox, who worked with its youth.

External links
 Baltimore Yearly Meeting Website.
 Baltimore Yearly Meeting Camping Program.
 Baltimore Yearly Meeting draft epistles collection from Friends Historical Library of Swarthmore College

References

Quakerism in Maryland
Quakerism in Pennsylvania
Quakerism in Washington, D.C.
Quakerism in Virginia
Quaker yearly meetings
Quakerism in the United States
Annual events in Maryland
1672 establishments in Maryland
Recurring events established in 1672